Nathaniel David is an American scientist and entrepreneur who co-founded a series of technology companies in the biotechnology and sustainable energy sectors, including Syrrx (acquired by Takeda Pharmaceutical Company), Achaogen (NASDAQ: AKAO), Kythera Biopharmaceuticals (NASDAQ: KYTH, acquired by Allergan), Sapphire Energy and Unity Biotechnology. These companies have collectively raised more than $1.5 billion in financing.

Biography 
David earned an A.B. in Biology from Harvard University and a Ph.D. in Molecular and Cellular Biology from University of California, Berkeley. He co-founded his first company, Syrrx, during the final year of his doctoral work at UC Berkeley. Syrrx was the first company in the world to build a high-throughput structural biology ‘factory,’ using automation, nano-scale experiments, and crystallography to make the determination of atomic structures of proteins easier, faster, and cheaper.

In 2002, while at Syrrx, he was named to the MIT Technology Review TR35 as one of the top 35 innovators in the world under the age of 35.

In 2005, Syrrx was acquired by Takeda, and the FDA-approved drug Nesina arose from Syrrx discovery efforts.

David left Syrrx to co-found Achaogen (NASDAQ: AKAO), an antibiotic company, and Kythera Biopharmaceticals (NASDAQ: KYTH). He served as Chief Science Officer of Kythera while the company created a now-FDA-approved injectable drug Kybella that triggers the selective destruction of fat cells. Kythera went public in October 2012 on the NASDAQ exchange under the ticker symbol KYTH, and was acquired by Allergan in 2015 for $2.1 billion.

Achaogen's antibiotic plazomicin is effective against multidrug-resistant infections of Enterobacteriaceae. In 2016, plazomicin demonstrated noninferiority for urinary tract infections (UTIs) in a pivotal phase III trial against colistin, and against meropenem for complicated UTIs and acute pyelonephritis. The U.S. Food and Drug Administration (FDA) approved plazomicin for adults with complicated UTIs and limited or no alternative treatment options in 2018; it is now sold under the brand name Zemdri.
In April 2019, Achaogen declared bankrupt.

In 2007, while still serving as Chief Science Officer at Kythera, David co-founded Sapphire Energy, a company with a mission to develop renewable, algae-derived transportation fuels that are 100% compliant with the existing energy infrastructure. In 2010, the company began construction of the world's first commercial algal bio-refinery, a project that was awarded more than $100 million in federal funding.

In 2011, David co-founded Unity Biotechnology (NASDAQ: UBX), a company dedicated to lengthening human healthspan by selectively clearing senescent cells from the body. UNITY is creating medicines that target multiple diseases of aging. David is currently the President of Unity Biotechnology.

References

Living people
American molecular biologists
1967 births
Harvard College alumni
American company founders
University of California, Berkeley alumni